Akbar Mirza Baig (born 5 May 1974) is an Indian-born Ugandan cricketer. He has played in all four first-class games that Uganda has taken part in to date.

1974 births
Living people
Ugandan cricketers
Ugandan people of Indian descent